Samsung Galaxy J6+ is a mid range Android smartphone produced by Samsung Electronics in 2018.

Specifications

Hardware 
The Galaxy J6+ is powered by Qualcomm MSM8917 Snapdragon 425 (28 nm) SoC including a quad-core 1.4 GHz Cortex-A53 CPU, an Adreno 308 GPU with 3 or 4 GB RAM and 32 or 64 GB of internal storage which can be upgraded up to 256 GB via microSD card.

The Galaxy J6+ display is larger than other phones in the same series launched in 2018. It has a 6.0-inch TFT LCD display with HD Ready resolution, ~73.6% screen-to-body ratio, 720x1480 pixels, 18.5:9 ratio and ~274 ppi density. At the above of screen, there is a front-facing camera with 8MP (F1.9) resolution. On the top center of the rear panel, there is a dual rear camera setup with 13 MP (f/1.7) + 5 MP (f/1.9) sensors with live focus, portrait mode and background blur options. At the device, there is a fingerprint reader integrated to the power button. The phone has a 3300 mAh Li-Ion non-removable battery.

Software 
The Galaxy J6+ is shipped with Android 8.1 "Oreo" and Samsung's Samsung Experience user interface. In January 2019, an update to 9.0 "Pie" and One UI was made available.

See also 

 Samsung Galaxy
 Samsung Galaxy J series
 Samsung Galaxy J4+
 Samsung Galaxy J8

References

External links 
 

Samsung Galaxy
Samsung Electronics
Samsung smartphones
Android (operating system) devices
Mobile phones introduced in 2018
Mobile phones with multiple rear cameras